As of December 31, 1946, the population of the country was 7,029,349.

Ethnic groups 

Number and share of ethnic groups.

Sources 

1946 censuses
Censuses in Bulgaria
1946 in Bulgaria